The 1970 European Judo Championships were the 19th edition of the European Judo Championships, and were held in East Berlin, East Germany on 23 and 24 May 1970. Championships were subdivided into six individual competitions, and a separate team competition.

Medal overview

Individual

Teams

Medal table

References 
 
 Results of the 1970 European Judo Championships (JudoInside.com)

E
European Judo Championships
Judo competitions in Germany
Sports competitions in East Berlin
1970s in Berlin
International sports competitions hosted by East Germany